The Russia men's national water polo team is the representative for Russia in international men's water polo. The team is a successor of the Soviet water polo team.

History

In the Russian Empire
Water polo in Russia dates back to 1910, when the sport was included into the national water sports programme. The Shuvalov school was opened back then, featuring rules that differed from the international rules. In 1913, the first water polo tournament was played between the Shuvalov school and Moscow, with the first winning 3–2. The new sport progressed in Russia, as all swimming organizations included this sport into their programme. P. Erofeev and A. Shemansky further populized water polo by publishing brochures with rules and hints.

In the Soviet Union
As previously, water polo was predominant in Moscow and Leningrad (formerly known as St. Petersburg). However, this changed when the water polo teams of the Black Sea Fleet, Baltic Fleet and Caspian Flotilla further spread water polo in Russia. In the early history, water polo was popular especially among sailors. The strongest teams were Delfin of Leningrad and the Moscow Life Saving Society and the Yacht-Club. Following the resolution by the organizing bureau of the Central Committee of the Communist Party of the Soviet Union in 1925, physical culture has been greatly propagated in Russia, stimulating water polo as well.

The first championship took place in 1925. Apart from the teams of Leningrad, Moscow and Kiev, the tournament featured teams from the Caucasus, Crimea, Ural, as well as the aforementioned fleet teams. Three years later, water polo was included in the All-Union Spartakiade (sports festival). The team of Leningrad dominated in Russian water polo until 1933, as the city had winter water pools and so had more training opportunities. In 1946, the USSR Water Polo Cup was introduced. One year later, the Soviet Union was selected into the FINA. The national water polo then debuted at the 1952 Winter Olympics in Helsinki.

Results

Olympic Games

1996 – 5th place
2000 –  Silver medal
2004 –  Bronze medal

World Championship

1994 –  Bronze medal
1998 – 6th place
2001 –  Bronze medal
2003 – 10th place
2005 – 7th place
2007 – 7th place
2015 – 14th place
2017 – 8th place
2022 – Disqualified

World Cup

 1993 – 5th place
 1995 –  Bronze medal
 1997 – 4th place
 1999 – 4th place
 2002 –  Gold medal
 2006 – 8th place

World League

 2002 –  Gold medal
 2005 – 6th place
 2006 – 14th place
 2007 – 13th place
 2008 – 13th place
 2009 – 15th place
 2010 – 13th place
 2011 – 14th place
 2012 – Preliminary round
 2013 – 5th place
 2014 – Preliminary round
 2015 – Preliminary round
 2016 – Preliminary round
 2017 – 5th place
 2018 – Preliminary round
 2019 – Preliminary round

European Championship

1993 – 6th place
1995 – 6th place
1997 –  Bronze medal
1999 – 5th place
2001 – 5th place
2003 – 4th place
2006 – 9th place
2008 – 10th place
2010 – 11th place
2014 – 11th place
2016 – 8th place
2018 – 7th place
2020 – 8th place
2022 – Disqualified

Current squad
Roster for the 2020 Men's European Water Polo Championship.

Head coach: Sergey Yevstigneyev

See also
 Russia men's Olympic water polo team records and statistics
 Soviet Union men's national water polo team
 Russia women's national water polo team

References

Men's national water polo teams
 
Men's sport in Russia